The Usquepaug Road Historic District is a historic district near the village of Usquepaug in South Kingstown, Rhode Island.  It consists of a collection of properties, mostly on the south side of Usequepaug Road (Rhode Island Route 138) between the Usquepaug Cemetery and Dugway Bridge Road.  Although the area began as a rural, agricultural area, it developed into a modest rural village, with a church, school, and cluster of vernacular rural houses.  The schoolhouse was destroyed in the New England Hurricane of 1938.

The district was listed on the National Register of Historic Places in 1987.

See also
National Register of Historic Places listings in Washington County, Rhode Island

References

Historic districts in Washington County, Rhode Island
South Kingstown, Rhode Island
Historic districts on the National Register of Historic Places in Rhode Island